Klinger is a surname. Notable people with the surname include:

 Bob Klinger (1908–1977), American baseball player
 Chad Klinger (active 1998–2013), Canadian country music artist
 David Klinger (born 1958), American criminologist and former police officer
 Dietmar Klinger (born 1958), German football player
 Fausto Klinger (born 1953), Ecuadorian footballer
 Friedrich Maximilian Klinger (1752–1831), German dramatist and novelist
 Georgette Klinger (1915–2004), Czech-born American businesswoman and cosmetologist
 Gustav Klinger (1876–1937), Russian Bolshevik politician
 Joe Klinger (1902–1960), American baseball player
 Julie Michelle Klinger (born 1983) American geographer
 Julius Klinger (1876–1942), Austrian painter and illustrator
 Leslie S. Klinger (born 1946), American attorney and writer
 Margrit Klinger (born 1960), West German middle distance runner
 Marino Klinger (1936–1975), Colombian footballer
 Martin Klinger (born 1980), Ecuadorian association football player
 Max Klinger (1857–1920), German symbolist artist
 Michael Klinger (producer) (1921–1989), British film producer
 Michael Klinger (born 1980), Australian cricketer
 Miroslav Klinger (1893–1979), Czech gymnast 
 Nir Klinger (born 1966), Israeli football manager and former player
 Ron Klinger (born 1941), Australian bridge player and author
 William Klinger (1972−2015), Croatian historian
 Stefan Klinger (born 1978), German ski mountaineer
 Tim Klinger (born 1984), German professional road bicycle racer

See also
 Maxwell Klinger, a fictional character in M*A*S*H
 Jan Klingers (1929–1994), Dutch sprint canoeist

German-language surnames
Jewish surnames